Pir Zubair Shah is a Pakistani journalist, hailing from South Waziristan in the tribal areas along the Afghan border, with The New York Times.
In 2009 Pir Zubair Shah shared a 2009 Pulitzer Prize for International Reporting with Jane Perlez, Eric P. Schmitt and Mark Mazzetti.

References

Pakistani male journalists
People from North Waziristan
People from Waziristan
Pashtun people
The New York Times people
Living people
Year of birth missing (living people)